Aleksandar Mladenović (born December 2, 1984) is a Serbian professional basketball player for Konstantin.

Professional career 

On December 18, 2017, Mladenović signed for MKS Dąbrowa Górnicza of the Polish Basketball League.

References

External links 
 Player Profile at realgm.com
 Player Profile at eurobasket.com
 Player Profile at PLK
 Player Profile at proballers.com
 Player Profile at bgbasket.com
 Player Profile at EuroLeague
 Player Profile at beoexcell.net
Player Profile Picture at konstantinokk.rs

1984 births
Living people
Basketball League of Serbia players
Centers (basketball)
CSU Pitești players
KK Ergonom players
KK Lions/Swisslion Vršac players
KK Mega Basket players
KK Hemofarm players
OKK Konstantin players
Serbian expatriate basketball people in Poland
Serbian expatriate basketball people in Romania
Serbian men's basketball players
Śląsk Wrocław basketball players
Basketball players from Niš